Can't Stop Won't Stop may refer to:

 Can't Stop Won't Stop (book), a book written by Jeff Chang
 Can't Stop Won't Stop (album), a 2008 album by The Maine
 "Can't Stop Won't Stop" (Usher song), 2012
 "Can't Stop, Won't Stop" (Young Gunz song), 2003
 "Can't Stop, Won't Stop", a 2000 song by Madball from Hold It Down